The Advocates was a Scottish legal drama, broadcast on ITV, that ran for two series between 2 April 1991 and 23 March 1992. The series starred Ewan Stewart and Isla Blair as the main protagonists, Greg McDowell and Katherine Dunbar. The first series was released on DVD on 12 April 2010. The second series was released on 20 September. A complete box set was released by Go|Entertain on 23 September 2013.

Cast
 Ewan Stewart as Greg McDowell
 Isla Blair as Katherine Dunbar
 Hugh Ross as Archie Hoseason
 Alison Peebles as Vivien Lidell

Series 1
 Stella Gonet as Alex Abercorn
 Michael Byrne as Campbell Reid
 Cal MacAninch as Milligan
 Shirley Henderson as Andrea
 Clive Russell as D.C.I. Ross
 Sean Murray as D.S. Sam Coutts

Series 2
 James Fleet as Phillip Jackson
 Hugh Fraser as John Naismith
 Michael Kitchen as James McCandlish
 Siobhan Redmond as Janie Naismith
 Rachel Weisz as Sarah Thompson
 Finlay Welsh as Malcolm Davies
 Stuart Hepburn as D.C.I. Michael Smith
 Robert Carlyle as D.C. Murray

Episodes

Series 1 (1991)

Series 2 (1992)

References

External links

1991 Scottish television series debuts
1992 Scottish television series endings
1990s Scottish television series
1990s British crime drama television series
1990s British legal television series
British crime television series
British drama television series
ITV television dramas
Television shows produced by Scottish Television
English-language television shows
Scottish television shows
Serial drama television series
Television shows set in Scotland
Television shows set in Edinburgh